Rechnaya Sosnovka is a rural locality (a village) in Churovskoye Rural Settlement, Sheksninsky District, Vologda Oblast, Russia. The population was 27 as of 2002.

Geography 
Rechnaya Sosnovka is located 19 km north of Sheksna (the district's administrative centre) by road. Beregovoy is the nearest rural locality.

References 

Rural localities in Sheksninsky District